Rosa 'Jude the Obscure (aka AUSjo) is a pale apricot shrub rose, bred by British rose breeder, David C. H. Austin in 1989. It was introduced into the UK by David Austin Roses Limited (UK) in 1995. The rose is named after the 19th century novel, Jude the Obscure, by the British writer, Thomas Hardy.

Description
It has large flowers with an average  in  diameter. Ovoid, apricot buds open to a fully double, cupped bloom form that appear ruffled when they are fully open. The flowers are pale apricot with a cream center and pale, almost white outer petals. The rose has a strong, fruity fragrance. 'Jude the Obscure' blooms in flushes throughout the season. The plant is prickly with lax stems and has medium, semi-glossy, dark green foliage. It is very disease resistant.

History

David Austin roses
David C. H. Austin (1926 – 2018) was an award-winning rose breeder, nursery owner and writer from Shropshire, England. He began breeding roses in the 1950s, with the goal of creating new shrub rose varieties that would possess the best qualities of old-fashioned roses while incorporating the long flowering characteristics of hybrid tea roses and floribundas. His first commercially successful rose cultivar was 'Constance Spry', which he introduced in 1961. He created a new, informal class of roses in the 1960s, which he named "English Roses". Austin's roses are generally known today as "David Austin Roses". Austin attained international commercial success with his new rose varieties. Some of his most popular roses include 'Wife of Bath' (1969), 'Graham Thomas' (1983),  and 'Abraham Darby' (1985)

'Jude the Obscure' 
'Jude the Obscure' was bred by Austin 1989 and introduced in the UK by David Austin Roses Limited (UK) in 1995. The cultivar was developed from a cross between the two shrub roses, 'Abraham Darby' x 'Windrush'. The rose variety is named after the 19th century novel, Jude the Obscure, by the British writer, Thomas Hardy.

Notes

Sources
  
 
 

 
Jude the Obscure 
1995 introductions